Gerardo Arturo González Sü (March 2, 1984) is a Mexican entrepreneur.

Early years

Gonzalez was born in Guadalajara City and had early childhood in Dallas, Texas. He studied firstly at TEC de Monterrey Campus Guadalajara International Negotiations. Afterwards, he would study in ESC Dijon where he would do his international studies at an Exchange Program.

Biography

Back in Guadalajara, he worked at a local television program called "Bodas+Modas TV".  Aside his journalistic work, he has also been judge of many beauty pageant contests such as Miss Polonia Webmasters 2006.

External links
 Miss Mexico Pageant
 Miss Polonia Webmasters 2006

Mexican businesspeople
Mexican company founders
1984 births
Living people